The 1960 New Brunswick general election was held on June 27, 1960, to elect 52 members to the 44th New Brunswick Legislative Assembly, the governing house of the province of New Brunswick, Canada. The election resulted in the defeat of the incumbent Conservative government of Hugh John Flemming by the Liberals led by Louis Robichaud.

References

Further reading
 

1960 elections in Canada
Elections in New Brunswick
1960 in New Brunswick
June 1960 events in Canada